Precious Gems is a compilation album by the band Ruby, containing tracks from their two studio albums from 1977 and 1978.

Track listing
 "Running Back to Me" (Fogerty, Oda)
 "Life Is But a Dream" (Fogerty)
 "Mistreater" (Oda)
 "Run With Your Love" (Oda)
 "Bart" [instrumental] (Oda)
 "Take Me Back to London" (Fogerty, Oda)
 "Can You Really Say" (Davis)
 "Singin' the Blues" (McCreary)
 "Dance All Night" (Davis)

Personnel
 Tom Fogerty – guitar, harmonica, vocals
 Randy Oda – guitar, keyboards, vocals
 Anthony Davis – bass, vocals
 Bobby Cochran – drums, percussion, vocals
 Jamie Putnam - cover art design
 Phil Carroll - art direction

References

External links
[ Precious Gems in allmusic.com]

Tom Fogerty albums
1984 albums
Fantasy Records albums